Roger Ronald Highfield  (born 1958 in Griffithstown, Wales) is an author, science journalist, broadcaster and Science Director at the Science Museum Group.

Education
Highfield was educated at Chase Side Primary School in Enfield and Christ's Hospital in Horsham. He read Chemistry at Pembroke College, Oxford and was awarded a Master of Arts degree in Chemistry in 1980 followed by a Doctor of Philosophy for research on neutron scattering from chemical species.

During his research career, he was the first to bounce a neutron off a soap bubble while he was working at the Institut Laue Langevin.

Career
Highfield served as the Science editor of The Daily Telegraph for more than 20 years. During that time he set up a long running science writing award for young people, a photography competition, the 'scientists meet the media' party, and organised mass experiments from 1994 with BBC's Tomorrow's World, called Live Lab and Megalab, such as the 'Truth Test' with Richard Wiseman.

He was the editor of the British magazine New Scientist from 2008 to 2011, where he redesigned the magazine and introduced new sections, notably Aperture and Instant Expert.

, Highfield became the Director of External Affairs at the Science Museum Group.

In 2012, he published the results of a mass intelligence test with Adrian Owen.

In 2016 he launched a critique of Big Data in biology with Ed Dougherty of Texas A&M and Peter Coveney.

In 2019, Highfield became the Science Director at the Science Museum Group.  For the group, he wrote a series of long-form blogs about the science of Covid19 and in 2021 organised a special Covid19 issue of the Royal Society journal Interface Focus.

Highfield is a Visiting Professor of Public Engagement at the Sir William Dunn School of Pathology. He is also Visiting Professor of Public Engagement at the Department of Chemistry at UCL and a Member of the Medical Research Council.  The Financial Times listed it as a book to read in 2023

Popular science books
Highfield has written or co-authored nine popular science books, and edited two written by Craig Venter, including:

Virtual You
This book coauthored with Peter Coveney, with a foreword by Nobelist Venki Ramakrishnan, is the first popular account of the use of digital twins of human beings to usher in a new era of personalized and predictive medicine. The Financial Times listed it as a book to read in 2023.

The Dance of Life
In 2020, his book The Dance of Life: Symmetry Cells and How We Become Human, co-authored with Magdalena Zernicka-Goetz, was published in the UK and US. The first-person account of trailblazing research on the first artificial embryo-like structure, extending the time embryos survive in the laboratory and the dawn of human life was described by Alice Roberts as 'the best book about science and life that I have ever read'.  The book was positively reviewed in Nature and Science, for example.

The Mind Readers
In 2014 he wrote a 10,000-word article The Mind Readers in Mosaic, published by the Wellcome Trust. His account of the efforts to communicate with brain damaged patients that suffer disorders of consciousness was reproduced in other media worldwide, such as Gizmodo, The Week, The Independent and Pacific Standard.

Supercooperators

In 2011 his book Supercooperators: The Mathematics of Evolution, Altruism and Human Behaviour (Or, Why We Need Each Other to Succeed) was published, co-authored with Martin Nowak. A review published in Nature by Manfred Milinski describes the book as "part autobiography, part textbook, and reads like a best-selling novel." David Willetts, in the Financial Times, described the book as an "excellent example" of using the nexus of evolutionary biology, game theory and neuroscience to understand the development of cooperation in society

After Dolly
In 2006 his book After Dolly: The Uses and Misuses of Human Cloning was published, co-authored with Ian Wilmut. Steven Poole in The Guardian describes the book as "an extremely lucid and readable explanation of the history of cloning and biologists' ideas for the future."

The Science of Harry Potter
In 2002 his book The Science of Harry Potter: How Magic Really Works was published. Christine Kenneally in The New York Times describes the book as "an enjoyably indirect survey of modern science."

The Physics of Christmas

In 1998 his book The Physics of Christmas: from the aerodynamics of reindeer to the thermodynamics of turkey was published. The British edition, Can Reindeer Fly?, got the world's shortest book review ('No')

Frontiers of Complexity

In 1996 his book Frontiers of Complexity: the search for order in a chaotic world was published, co-authored with Peter Coveney. The Nobel Laureate Philip Warren Anderson commented that 'I believe firmly, with Coveney and Highfield, that complexity is the scientific frontier.'

The Private Lives of Albert Einstein

In 1993 his book The Private Lives of Albert Einstein was published, co-authored with Paul Carter. J.G. Ballard commented in a review: "In their lucid and scrupulously researched biography, Roger Highfield and Paul Carter reveal a very different Einstein. To their great credit, these startling revelations never diminish the man but only increase our sense of wonder.”

The Arrow of Time

In 1991 his book The Arrow of Time was published, co-authored with Peter Coveney, which became a Sunday Times top ten best-seller and New York Times notable book of the year.

Awards and honours
In 2014, he gave the Douglas Adams Memorial Lecture for Save the Rhino with Simon Singh.

Highfield is a member of the Longitude Committee, for the Longitude Prize 2014,

Highfield wrote for a time for Newsweek. and still makes occasional contributions to The Sunday Times, The Evening Standard, The Guardian and Aeon magazine.

After testing a treadmill desk in 2006, Highfield uses one at work in the Science Museum and has advocated their widespread adoption. He often invites his visitors to take it for a spin, including Heston Blumenthal, Craig Venter, Samira Ahmed, Al Jean, Ben Miller and Dame Gail Rebuck

He has been listed on the Evening Standard Progress 1000 in 2012 and 2016.

In 2012, Highfield gave the Wilkins-Bernal-Medawar Lecture, on Heroes of Science, at the Royal Society.

In 2020, Highfield was elected a Fellow of the Academy of Medical Sciences

Highfield was appointed Officer of the Order of the British Empire (OBE) in the 2022 New Year Honours for services to public engagement with science.

Personal life
Highfield met his wife, Julia Brookes, at the University of Oxford. They married in 1992, at Sandals, Montego Bay. 

They have one son and one daughter.

References 

1958 births
People educated at Christ's Hospital
Living people
Science journalists
Museum people
Fellows of the Royal Society of Biology
Alumni of Pembroke College, Oxford
The Daily Telegraph people
Officers of the Order of the British Empire
New Scientist people